Jerry Ragonese (born 1986) is an American professional lacrosse player for the Chaos Lacrosse Club of the Premier Lacrosse League. He is from Berkeley Heights, New Jersey and went to Governor Livingston High School. He is a graduate of Rochester Institute of Technology where he played for the RIT Tigers. He also is a co-founder of the Faceoff Academy and Pro Athletics, a Los Angeles-based uniform and apparel manufacturer.

Statistics

MLL

PLL

References

External links
 Lacrosse Industry Podcast: Jerry Ragonese - Podcast featuring Ragonese

Rochester Institute of Technology alumni
Major League Lacrosse players
Lacrosse players from New Jersey
People from Berkeley Heights, New Jersey
Premier Lacrosse League players
Sportspeople from Union County, New Jersey
1986 births
Living people
RIT Tigers
New York Lizards players
Charlotte Hounds players
Rochester Rattlers players